Our Boys Institute (OBI) was a junior branch of YMCA in South Australia, catering for boys aged 13–18, a forerunner to the various youth groups which flourished in the first half of the twentieth century such as the Boys' Brigade, Scouting, etc. 
OBI promoted a Christian philosophy and also ran camps and provided employment assistance for young men.

OBI had its own purpose-built premises at 221 Wakefield Street, Adelaide, which were opened in 1896, and included lecture and games rooms, indoor running track and pool. At its opening on 23 February 1897 there was an exhibition match of basketball between boys from the OBI and the YMCA, the first recorded basketball match in Australia.

F. W. Dancker was the architect for the building. The carved sandstone Venetian Gothic façade of the building was listed on the South Australian Heritage Register on 24 July 1980. The façade of the Our Boys Institute bears similarities to the Chicago Athletic Association Building; it has been suggested that Danker was influenced by the club and its architect, Henry Ives Cobb.

The building has since been used as office space and an external studies college and was converted by architects JPE Design Studio to a boutique hotel in 2008. The hotel opened as Wakefield Residence but has since changed the name to Adabco Boutique Hotel.

A plaque on the facade of the building commemorates the role played by Lady Victoria Buxton, the wife of the South Australian Governor, Sir Thomas Buxton. Lady Buxton, who lived in Adelaide between 1895 and 1898, was a Christian philanthropist who supported the Mothers' Union and YWCA.

Our Girls' Institute was a similar organization run under the auspices of the YWCA. Phoebe Chapple (1879–1967) and Edith Lavington Tite (1877–1955) were prominent leaders.

References

YMCA
Buildings and structures in Adelaide
Gothic Revival architecture in Adelaide
South Australian Heritage Register
Child-related organisations in Australia
South Australian places listed on the defunct Register of the National Estate